Dze (Ѕ ѕ) is a letter of the Cyrillic script, used  in the Macedonian alphabet to represent the voiced alveolar affricate , similar to the pronunciation of  in "needs" or "kids" in English.  It is derived from the letter dzelo or zelo of the Early Cyrillic alphabet, and it was used historically for Old Church Slavonic, Ukrainian, Russian, and Romanian. 

Although fully obsolete everywhere in the Cyrillic world by the 19th century, the letter zelo was revived in 1944 by the designers of the alphabet of the then-codified Macedonian language. The phoneme is also present in Greek (ΤΖ τζ) and Albanian (X x), both non-Slavic neighbours to the Macedonian language; all are a part of the Balkan linguistic area.  In the early 21st century, the same letter also appeared in Vojislav Nikčević's proposal for the new alphabet for the modern Montenegrin language.  

The most common early letterform resembles the Latin letter S (S s), but it is also seen reversed like the Latin letter Reversed S (Ƨ ƨ), or with a tail and a tick.

Abkhaz has Abkhazian Dze (Ӡ ӡ), with an identical function and name but a different shape.

Origin
The letter is descended from ѕѣло (pronounced dzělo) in the Early Cyrillic alphabet, where it had the numerical value 6. The letter Dzělo was itself based on the letter Dzelo in the Glagolitic alphabet. In the Glagolitic alphabet, it was written , and had the numerical value of 8. In Old Church Slavonic it was called ѕѣло (pronounced dzeló), and in Church Slavonic it is called ѕѣлѡ (pronounced zeló).

The origin of Glagolitic letter Dzelo is unclear, but the Cyrillic Ѕ may have been influenced by the Greek stigma , the medieval form of the archaic letter digamma, which had the same form and numerical value (6). Thus the visual similarity of the Cyrillic  and Latin  is largely coincidental.

Development

  is used in root derived from these seven words beginning with : ѕвѣзда, ѕвѣрь, ѕеліе, ѕлакъ, ѕлый, ѕмій, ѕѣлѡ ("star, beast, vegetable, herb, angry, dragon, very");
  is used in all remaining cases.
  has the numerical value of 6, whereas  has the numerical value of 7;

See also Reforms of Russian orthography.

 was used in the Romanian Cyrillic alphabet (where it represented ) until the alphabet was abolished in favour of a Latin-based alphabet in 1860-62.  was also used—albeit rarely—to the middle of the 19th century in the Serbian civil script, whose orthography was closer to Church Slavonic (compared to Russian). Vuk Karadžić's Serbian Cyrillic alphabet (1868) did not include , instead favouring the digraph  to represent .

In Ukrainian, the sound  is integrated as part of the language's phonology, but it mainly occurs in loanwords rather than in words of native Ukrainian origin.

Usage
 is now only used in the Macedonian alphabet. A commission formed to standardise the Macedonian language and orthography decided to adopt the letter on December 4, 1944, after a vote of 10-1. The letter represents  (examples including: ѕид/dzid, 'wall' and ѕвезда/dzvezda, 'star'). The corresponding sound is used in all dialects of Macedonian.

 is also included in Microsoft's Serbian Cyrillic keyboard layout, although it is not used in the Serbian Cyrillic Alphabet. The Serbian keyboard in Ubuntu replaces Ѕ with a second Ж.

Related letters and other similar characters
З з : Cyrillic letter Ze
S s : Latin letter S
Ƨ ƨ : Latin letter Reversed S
X x : Latin letter X, an Albanian alphabet letter
Ꚃ ꚃ : Cyrillic letter Dzwe
Ḑ ḑ : Latin letter Ḑ, a Livonian alphabet letter
D̦ d̦ : Latin letter D̦, an obsolete Romanian letter
Dz : Digraph Dz

Computing codes

See also
Glagolitic alphabet
Early Cyrillic alphabet
Cyrillic script
Russian alphabet
Reforms of Russian orthography
Romanian Cyrillic alphabet
Macedonian alphabet

References

External links

 A Berdnikov and O Lapko, "Old Slavonic and Church Slavonic in TEX and Unicode", EuroTEX ’99 Proceedings, September 1999 (PDF)